Juan Elías Cominges Mayorga (born 1 October 1983) is a Peruvian retired footballer who played as an attacking midfielder. Cominges has risen to fame in the South American scene over the recent years.  This right-footed midfielder first attracted attention due to being the younger brother of forward Paul Cominges, who had been an effective striker in the major clubs in Peru and at a few clubs overseas.

Club career
He got his chance in the youth divisions of popular club Universitario de Deportes and slowly earned a spot in the main team as well as in the national youth teams of Peru.  To give him a chance to play more games he was loaned to the club Coronel Bolognesi of Tacna in 2002, where he performed well.  He then returned to the 'U' in 2003, where he had another good year.  Due to money arguments the next year he moved to rival team Sporting Cristal, where he performed so well, scoring several goals and leading the team to a national championship, that he was named the Peruvian player of the year by the media outlets.

In 2005 former 'U' star José "Chemo" del Solar, on his first outing as a coach, took Juan to Argentine club Colón de Santa Fe. Juan had several ups and downs in his performance, but secured a starting place as the new '10' of the Peru national team.  The next year he migrated to Estudiantes de La Plata. He played a few games of the Copa Libertadores before developing a back injury, which kept him off the fields until July 2006. From there on he played irregularly, but he remained part of the championship-winning team.  He has recently moved back to Sporting Cristal, where he played in the 2007 Torneo Descentralizado season.

In January 2008, he was signed by Venezuelan club Caracas FC, making his debut against Union Lara.

International career

Honours

Club
Estudiantes de La Plata
Apertura: 2006

References

External links

1983 births
Living people
Sportspeople from Callao
Association football midfielders
Peruvian footballers
Peru international footballers
Club Universitario de Deportes footballers
Coronel Bolognesi footballers
Sporting Cristal footballers
Club Atlético Colón footballers
Estudiantes de La Plata footballers
Caracas FC players
Atlético Huila footballers
José Gálvez FBC footballers
Al-Qadsiah FC players
Cobresol FBC footballers
Cienciano footballers
Guarani FC players
Unión Comercio footballers
Sport Boys footballers
Peruvian Primera División players
Argentine Primera División players
Categoría Primera A players
Peruvian expatriate footballers
Peruvian expatriate sportspeople in Argentina
Peruvian expatriate sportspeople in Colombia
Expatriate footballers in Argentina
Expatriate footballers in Venezuela
Expatriate footballers in Brazil
Expatriate footballers in Colombia
Expatriate footballers in Saudi Arabia
Saudi Professional League players